Cerhenice is a market town in Kolín District in the Central Bohemian Region of the Czech Republic. It has about 1,800 inhabitants.

Administrative parts

The village of Cerhýnky is an administrative part of Cerhenice.

Etymology
The original name of the village was Crhynice, meaning "the village of Crhyň's people".

Geography
It lies in a flat agricultural landscape of the Central Elbe Table.

History
The first written mention of Cerhenice is from 1295. For centuries, it was owned by various lower noblemen. Around 1520, during the rule of Eliška of Střížkov, the village was promoted to a market town. For the longest time, Cerhenice was owned by the Střela of Rokyce family (1550–1689). The most notable owners were the Sternberg family, who inherited Cerhenice in 1689, and the Kolowrat family, who bought it from the Sternbergs in 1757.

Demographics

Economy
Part of the Velim railway test circuit is located in the territory of Cerhenice.

Sights

The Church of Saint John of Nepomuk was built in the Baroque style in 1734, by Countess Leopoldina of Sternberg. She also had built the statue of Our Lady of Sorrows from 1745, located in the middle of the town square.

The Gothic fortress in Cerhenice was built in 1340. In 1618, it was rebuilt in the Renaissance style. The fortress was looted by rebellious peasants in 1775 and three years later, the administration was moved to the newly built castle in the neighborhood. In modern times, the building was converted into apartments.

The Cerhenice Castle was built on the site of the farm buildings of the old fortress in 1770–1771. It was built by the Institute of Nobles in Prague and never served as the residence of the nobility. It is a one-story baroque building. Today it is privately owned.

Notable people
Blanka Waleská (1910–1986), actress

References

External links

Market towns in the Czech Republic